Vexillum flexicostatum is a species of small sea snail, marine gastropod mollusk in the family Costellariidae, the ribbed miters.

Description

Distribution

References

flexicostatum
Gastropods described in 1880